John Charles Pullman Trevett (30 July 1942 – 29 April 2019) was an English first-class cricketer.

Trevett was born at Woking in July 1942. He was educated at Steyning Grammar School, before going up to Wadham College, Oxford. While studying at Oxford, he made two appearances in first-class cricket for Oxford University against Lancashire and Middlesex at Oxford in 1962. Trevett died at Brighton in April 2019.

References

External links

1942 births
2019 deaths
People from Woking
People educated at Steyning Grammar School
Alumni of Wadham College, Oxford
English cricketers
Oxford University cricketers